The Coleman Company, Inc. is an American brand of outdoor recreation products, especially camping gear, now owned by Newell Brands. The company's new headquarters are in Chicago, and it has facilities in Wichita, Kansas, and in Texas. There are approximately 4,000 employees. Some of the products manufactured are portable stoves, lanterns, coolers, sleeping bags, camp chairs, and shelters.

History 
The company was founded by William Coffin Coleman, who began selling gasoline pressure lamps in 1900 in Kingfisher, Oklahoma. In 1905, the company provided a demonstration for the 1905 Cooper vs. Fairmount football game (now called Sterling College and Wichita State University). Coleman gas lamps were provided to play the first night football game west of the Mississippi River. In 1996, the company acquired the French Campingaz. Through a series of acquisitions via Sunbeam Products and Jarden, Coleman is now a subsidiary of Newell Brands.

Products 

Throughout its history, Coleman has produced a wide variety of equipment primarily aimed at the camping and recreational markets.  A prominent product is the Coleman Lantern, a series of pressure lamps that were originally made to burn gasoline. Current models use Coleman fuel (white gas) or propane and use one or two gas mantles to produce an intense white light.

In the past, the company also produced a range of cooking stoves and domestic irons. Today, Coleman also manufactures camp stoves (Coleman produced the original "G.I. Pocket Stove"), sleeping bags, coolers, hot tubs, generators, watches, sandals, tents, dog toys, and backpacks among other things. They also make a line of small boats, including canoes, pontoon boats, and johnboats. In the past they also sold pop-up travel trailers, Skiroule snowmobiles and the Hobie Cat brand of sailboats. The company has recently started producing a backyard barbecue grill, which is sold at Canadian Tire.

A separate company, Coleman Heating and Air Conditioning, sells home heating and air conditioning units. Coleman Heating and Air Conditioning is owned by Johnson Controls, and uses the Coleman name and logo under license.

Coleman also produces ATVs and mini bikes under the Coleman Powersports brand.

See also
 Coghlan's

References

External links

 
 Coleman Company History on Fundinguniverse.com
 W. C. Coleman Biography on the Kansas Historical Society

1900 establishments in Oklahoma Territory
2005 mergers and acquisitions
American companies established in 1900
Camping equipment manufacturers
Companies based in Wichita, Kansas
Cooler manufacturers
Manufacturing companies based in Kansas
Manufacturing companies established in 1900
Climbing and mountaineering equipment companies
Newell Brands
Recreational vehicle manufacturers
Sporting goods manufacturers of the United States